If Only It Weren't Love (German: Wenn die Liebe nicht wär'!) is a 1925 German silent drama film directed by Robert Dinesen, and starring Jenny Jugo and Fritz Alberti.

The film's sets were designed by the art director Willi Herrmann.

Cast
In alphabetical order
 Fritz Alberti
 Harry Halm
 Antonie Jaeckel
 Jenny Jugo
 Frieda Lehndorf
 Mary Nolan
 Karl Platen
 Hans Adalbert Schlettow
 Daisy Torrens
 Elsa Wagner

References

Bibliography
 Grange, William. Cultural Chronicle of the Weimar Republic. Scarecrow Press, 2008.

External links

1925 films
1925 drama films
German drama films
Films of the Weimar Republic
Films directed by Robert Dinesen
German silent feature films
German black-and-white films
Phoebus Film films
Silent drama films
1920s German films